The Nike Literary Award  is a literary prize awarded each year for the best book of a single living author writing in Polish and published the previous year. It is widely considered the most important award for Polish literature. Established in 1997 and funded by Gazeta Wyborcza, Poland's second largest daily paper, and the consulting company NICOM, it is conferred annually in October. It is open for nominees from all literary genres, including non-fiction essays and autobiographies. Each year, a nine-member jury selects the laureate in a three-stage process. Twenty official nominees are accepted in May, out of which seven finalists are declared in September. The final decision does not take place until the day of the award ceremony in October. The award consists of a statuette referring to the Greek goddess Nike, designed by the prominent Polish sculptor Kazimierz Gustaw Zemła, and a cash prize of currently PLN 100,000 (ca. $25,000).

In addition to the main jury award, there is an audience award based on the outcome of a vote on the seven official finalists conducted by Gazeta Wyborcza. The verdicts of the audience and jury have converged only occasionally (2000, 2001, 2004, 2015, 2018, 2019 and 2021). Two laureates of the award have been awarded the Nobel Prize in Literature: Czesław Miłosz (1980) and Olga Tokarczuk (2018). Tokarczuk and Wiesław Myśliwski are the only individuals to date to have received the Nike Award twice.

Laureates

Title and details of English translation stated where available.

Jury award

Audience award

Most nominations (1997–2022)

 10 nominations – Jerzy Pilch
 9 nominations – Andrzej Stasiuk
 7 nominations – Tadeusz Różewicz
 6 nominations – Julia Hartwig, Ewa Lipska, Olga Tokarczuk 
 5 nominations – Jacek Dehnel, Piotr Matywiecki, Czesław Miłosz, Jacek Podsiadło, Ryszard Przybylski, Jarosław Marek Rymkiewicz, Magdalena Tulli
 4 nominations – Marek Bieńczyk, Michał Głowiński, Henryk Grynberg, Ignacy Karpowicz, Urszula Kozioł, Marcin Świetlicki, Eugeniusz Tkaczyszyn-Dycki, Krzysztof Varga, Adam Zagajewski
 3 nominations – Justyna Bargielska, Joanna Bator, Wojciech Bonowicz, Sylwia Chutnik, Włodzimierz Kowalewski, Zbigniew Kruszyński, Dorota Masłowska, Wiesław Myśliwski, Joanna Olczak-Roniker, Tomasz Różycki, Małgorzata Szejnert, Wisława Szymborska, Adam Wiedemann, Michał Witkowski

See also
Polish literature
List of Polish writers
List of Polish poets
Angelus Award
Zbigniew Herbert International Literary Award
Ryszard Kapuściński Award for Literary Reportage

References

External links
Some information in English
Official site (Polish)

Polish literary awards
Awards established in 1997